Penalva is a municipality in the state of Maranhão, Brazil.

Penalva or Peñalva may also refer to:
Penalva do Castelo, a municipality in the district of Viseu, Portugal
S.C. Penalva do Castelo, its football club
David Penalva (born 1980), Portuguese rugby union footballer
Diego Penalva (born 1976), French footballer
Mariana Peñalva (born 1979), Mexican multidisciplinary artist
Toribio de Peñalva (1606–1685), Spanish military man

Spanish-language surnames